Janez "Jani" Brajkovič (born 18 December 1983) is a racing cyclist from Metlika, Slovenia, who most recently rode for UCI Continental team . He was the world under-23 Time Trial champion in 2004.

In 2018, while riding for the  team, Brajkovič was suspended after a positive anti-doping test. He was banned for just over a year, and once his suspension was complete, he rejoined the  team.

Career

Discovery Channel (2005–2007)
Brajkovič joined Discovery Channel midway through the 2005 season. In July he turned professional and made his début at the Eneco Tour and had a brilliant début start. But to prove it was no fluke he finished 14th in the time trial in the Deutschland Tour, and eleventh in the road race at the UCI Road World Championships.

Brajkovič started 2006 impressively as well, finishing 4th in the final time trial of Tour de Suisse to take 5th overall in the general classification. Before that, in the Volta a Catalunya, he took 3rd in the stage 1 time trial, and finished 5th overall just 48 seconds down on race winner David Cañada. He did not get to ride the Tour de France, but raced the Vuelta a España where he finished second on the first mountain stage, after getting beaten by Danilo Di Luca in the sprint at the summit.

On 22 April 2007 Brajkovič won the Tour de Georgia for his first win as a professional. He then endured a dry spell where he further acclimatised to regular top level competition before finishing second to Damiano Cunego at the Giro di Lombardia end of season classic.

Astana (2008–2009)
In 2008 Brajkovič raced in the Tour of California, the Vuelta a Murcia, Settimana Ciclistica Lombarda, the Volta a Catalunya, the Critérium du Dauphiné Libéré, the Slovenian National Road Race Championships, the Tour of Austria, the Deutschland Tour, the UCI Road World Championships, the Military World Championship, the Coppa Sabatini, the Giro dell'Emilia, the Gran Premio Bruno Beghelli and the Giro di Lombardia.

In 2009, Brajkovič took the leader's jersey in Stage 2 of the Giro del Trentino and held it until Ivan Basso took it on the final climb in Stage 4. Showing strong form, he rode in support of Levi Leipheimer in the Giro d'Italia.

Team RadioShack (2010–2011)
During the 2010 season, he won the Critérium du Dauphiné after being able to follow Tour de France champion Alberto Contador in the mountains and besting him in the longer time trial of the race. Following this victory, he was selected by the team to ride in his first Tour de France, mainly to support Lance Armstrong.

His 2011 Tour de France with  ended early on stage 5 after a crash prevented him from finishing.

Astana (2012–2014)
He won the Tour of Slovenia in 2012. Brajkovic later rode the Tour de France where he ended up finishing 9th overall.

After having a relatively quiet 2013 season, Brajkovič wore the red leader's jersey after his team won the stage 1 team time trial in the Vuelta a España. He wore it for one day and then lost it to teammate Vincenzo Nibali.

The 2014 season was statistically the worst year of Brajkovič's career. He failed to record a stage win for the first time, which was attributed to many injuries and illnesses.

UnitedHealthcare (2015–2016)
Brajkovič expressed an interest in wanting to return and ride in the United States for his third different American team.

Bahrain–Merida (2017)
Brajkovič joined newly formed team  for the 2017 season.

Adria Mobil (2018–2020)

After an unsuccessful 2017 season, Brajkovič rejoined his first professional team . In July 2018 the Union Cycliste Internationale (UCI) informed the team about a positive anti-doping test for methylhexanamine recorded by Brajkovič. Brajkovič could have received a ban of up to two years, but this was reduced to ten months by the UCI. He initially did not extend his contract beyond the end of 2018.

His first race was the 2.1-classified CRO Race.

Personal life
After his doping sentence, Brajkovič took to his personal website on 8 August 2019 to discuss his suffering with an eating disorder. He alleged that his positive test was the result of methylhexanamine contained in a food supplement he took while not being able to eat properly. He stated that he knew numerous fellow professional cyclists who suffered from the condition as well and that too little was done to prevent it.

Major results

2003
 7th Overall Giro delle Regioni
2004
 1st  Time trial, UCI Under-23 Road World Championships
 National Under-23 Road Championships
1st  Road race
1st  Time trial
 1st Trofeo Banca Popolare di Vicenza
 2nd  Time trial, UEC European Under-23 Road Championships
 2nd Overall Grand Prix Guillaume Tell
1st Stage 4a (ITT)
 2nd Gran Premio Palio del Recioto
 3rd Giro del Belvedere
 4th Overall Tour de Berlin
 5th Overall Tour of Slovenia
2005
 1st Stage 3 Jadranska Magistrala
 3rd  Time trial, UEC European Under-23 Road Championships
 5th Overall Tour of Slovenia
1st Young rider classification
 5th Gran Premio Palio del Recioto
 8th Trofeo Zsšdi
 9th Overall Giro del Trentino
 9th Giro d'Oro
2006
 5th Overall Tour de Georgia
1st Young rider classification
 5th Overall Volta a Catalunya
 5th Overall Tour de Suisse
 9th Overall Vuelta a Castilla y León
 Vuelta a España
Held  after Stages 7–8
2007
 1st  Overall Tour de Georgia
1st  Young rider classification
 4th Overall Volta a la Comunitat Valenciana
 5th Overall Tirreno–Adriatico
 10th Overall Tour de Romandie
 10th Overall Volta a Catalunya
2008
 2nd Giro di Lombardia
 3rd Overall Deutschland Tour
 7th Overall Volta a Catalunya
 7th Overall Tour of Austria
 8th Time trial, UCI Road World Championships
 8th Overall Tour de l'Ain
2009
 National Road Championships
1st  Time trial
3rd Road race
 2nd Overall Giro del Trentino
 6th Time trial, UCI Road World Championships
2010
 1st  Overall Critérium du Dauphiné
1st Stage 3 (ITT)
 4th Overall Giro di Sardegna
 4th Overall Vuelta a Castilla y León
 5th Overall Tour de Romandie
 8th Classica Sarda
 9th Overall Volta a Catalunya
 9th Overall Tour of California
2011
 1st  Time trial, National Road Championships
 3rd Overall Tour of Utah
 7th Overall Paris–Nice
 7th Overall Tour de Romandie
 9th Overall Critérium du Dauphiné
2012
 1st  Overall Tour of Slovenia
 1st Stage 3 Volta a Catalunya
 5th Overall USA Pro Cycling Challenge
 7th Overall Critérium du Dauphiné
 9th Overall Tour de France
 9th Overall Tour de Romandie
 10th Time trial, Olympic Games
2013
 Vuelta a España
1st Stage 1 (TTT)
 Held after Stage 1
2014
 3rd Overall Vuelta a Burgos
2015
 4th Overall Abu Dhabi Tour
 5th Overall Tour of the Gila
2016
 8th Overall Tour of the Gila
 9th Overall Tour of Slovenia
2018
 8th Overall Tour of Slovenia
2020
 6th Overall Tour de Hongrie
 8th Overall Giro della Regione Friuli Venezia Giulia

General classification results timeline

Notes

References

External links

1983 births
Living people
People from Metlika
Slovenian male cyclists
Cyclists at the 2012 Summer Olympics
Olympic cyclists of Slovenia
Doping cases in cycling
Slovenian sportspeople in doping cases